Casadei is an Italian surname. Notable people with the surname include:

Barbara Casadei, American doctor and academic
Domenico Casadei, Italian engineer
Fabio Casadei Turroni, Italian novelist
Maurizio Casadei, Sammarinese cyclist
Secondo Casadei, Italian musician
Cesare Casadei, Italian footballer

Italian-language surnames